The Nederlandse Spoorwegen (NS) Class 1300 was a Dutch locomotive in service for 48 years from 1952 until 2000.

It was built at the same time as the NS Class 1100 at Alsthom and was based on the SNCF Class CC 7100. The Class 1300 is a bigger 6-axle, Co′Co′, version of the Class 1100.

The first loco, the 1301, was delivered in 1952 and was first used at the opening of the electric service between Zwolle and Groningen.

After being in service for less than a year 1303 was damaged beyond repair when it collided with EMU 642 at Weesp on June 19, 1953. After this accident Alsthom delivered a new loco that was originally to be delivered as a CC 7100 to the SNCF. 1303 was  scrapped on the spot although some equipment was salvaged to be used in replacement loco 1311.

The locos numbered 1312-1316 were delivered in 1956 in a Berlin blue colour scheme (the locos delivered in 1952 were delivered in a turquoise colour scheme, but were painted Berlin blue in 1955).

During the 1980s the entire Class 1300 got prolonging maintenance and were painted yellow, with a big NS logo at the side. Also, the locos were all named after a Dutch city:

 1301 Dieren
 1302 Woerden
 1304 Culemborg
 1305 Alphen aan den Rijn
 1306 Brummen
 1307 Etten-Leur
 1308 Nunspeet
 1309 Susteren
 1310 Bussum
 1311 Best
 1312 Zoetermeer
 1313 Uitgeest
 1314 Hoorn
 1315 Tiel
 1316 Geldermalsen

In 2000 the last locomotives were withdrawn from service. 1302, 1304, 1312 and 1315 have been preserved.

In 2015 number 1304 came back into service for private operator HSL Logistik, but in February 2016 it broke down due to operator error. Late 2018 it was repaired by replacing a few traction motors and since then it is deployed by the Fairtrains foundation for occasional transfers. The objective of Fairtrains is to have museum equipment restored and preserved from the revenues of their use. Number 1315 is the next one to be refurbished and is expected to be operational again in the course of 2019.

Number 1312 is the working representative of this class for the Dutch Railway Museum, with number 1302 serving as spare part donor.

1300
Alstom locomotives
1500 V DC locomotives
Co′Co′ locomotives
Electric locomotives of the Netherlands
Standard gauge locomotives of the Netherlands
Railway locomotives introduced in 1952
Co′Co′ electric locomotives of Europe